Bluff Hospital is a hospital and clinic active in the medical care of foreign residents of Yokohama, Japan.

References

Naka-ku, Yokohama
Hospitals in Yokohama
Defunct hospitals in Japan
Hospitals established in 1863
Hospitals disestablished in 1982
1863 establishments in Japan
1982 disestablishments in Japan